Traité sur les apparitions des esprits et sur les vampires ou les revenans de Hongrie, de Moravie, &c. (Treatise on the Apparitions of Spirits and on Vampires or Revenants of Hungary, Moravia, et al.) is one of the many works by an Abbot monk named Antoine Augustin Calmet, an exegete and an 18th-century Lorraine scholar of the Benedictine Order; also known as Dom Calmet. The work was published in 2 volumes that dealt with the extensive investigation into occult matters regarding the apparitions of angels, demons and other spirits.

It included dissertations on various topics of magic, sorcery, witchcraft and instances of vampires, revenants and individuals returning from the grave. This study analyzed accounts of these various topics located in the Bible, mythology, cultural legends and famous accounts of historically documented cases or claims.

History
The work was first published in 1746 under the title Dissertations sur les apparitions des anges, des démons et des esprits, et sur les revenants et vampires de Hongrie, de Bohême, de Moravie et de Silésie. After a great deal of praise and response from his readers, the work was expanded and published with Privilege of the King of France in 1751 under the new title Traité sur les apparitions des esprits et sur les vampires ou les revenans de Hongrie, de Moravie, &c.. The new version included letters and dissertations by some of his readers and extra chapters as a response to refutations and various claims.

Publication history
 1746 Dissertations sur les apparitions des anges, des démons et des esprits, et sur les revenants et vampires de Hongrie, de Bohême, de Moravie et de Silésie 
(Dissertations on the apparitions of angels, of demons, and spirits and on Revenants or vampires of Hungary, Bohemia, Moravia and Silesia)
 1751 Traité sur les apparitions des esprits et sur les vampires ou les revenans de Hongrie, de Moravie, &c. 
(Treatise on the apparitions of Spirits and on Vampires or Revenants of Hungary, Moravia, etc.)

Structure
The total work consists of 115 chapters contained in two volumes. The dissertation is divided into four parts. In the first, Calmet speaks of good angels. In the second, of the appearance of bad angels. In the third, of the apparitions of souls of the dead. In the fourth, of the appearance of living men to others living, absent, distant, and this unknown to those who appear, occasionally adding research on magic, wizards, and witches, on the Sabbath, oracles, and the obsession and possession by demons throughout the volumes.

He used a scientific approach when looking into pre-modern cases of witchcraft, vampires, superstitious beliefs and various other topics of the occult. He delved into the use of the scientific method, biology, psychology, chemistry, etymology and investigated the history of various legends of folklore to determine whether a claim of hauntings, apparitions or magic were truth or fraud.

Tome 1
The treatise as a whole consists of extensive research across a wide range of topics. The first tome contains 52 chapters and mostly deals with the apparitions of spirits, angels and demons while also covering the study of magic, sorcery and witchcraft. Topics also include:

 Angelic and demonic intervention
 The history, reality and mythology of magic; divination; curses
 Understanding the difference between real accounts vs that of impostors
 Examples and instances of real possessions caused by the devil
 The power and authority which Satan and demons possess
 False prophets and predictions of happenstance
 The appearance and examinations of specters and pretended specters
 Examinations on Specters that haunt houses
 The dead who return to the earth
 Explanations and objections on the instances of apparitions;
 The studies on Familiars; Elves
 The secrets of physics and chemistry or Alchemy taken as supernatural things

Tome 2
The second tome consists of 63 chapters and includes a series of letters thereafter. The study includes:

 Resurrection of the dead
 Instances of people returning from the grave
 Examination to people being buried alive but thought to be dead
 Historical accounts of revenants, ghosts and vampires
 The study of vampires, ghosts in classical mythology and religions
 Historically recorded accounts of vampires between the 17th and 18th centuries
 Examinations on bodies that do not decay and corpses that show life after death
 The power of demons to kill and restore life
 On the return of the excommunicated
 Instances of bodies that devour their own flesh
 Instances on exhumed bodies and their examinations
 Analysis on whether vampires or revenants are truly dead
 Instances of people returning from the grave months after declared deceased.

Letters
Included in the printing of the second tome were many letters. Some were of approbation but also contained in this collection was a letter written by Marquis of Maffei that was of itself a selected dissertation on magical studies that was written in 16 chapters.

Themes

Demonic possession
Calmet, doubtful of the circumstances involved in the Loudun Possessions, made a detailed comparison to other cases he believed was more true to the principle symptoms of demonic possession.

Mademoiselle Elizabeth de Ranfaing
Calmet researched a judicial case that described the possession of Mademoiselle Elizabeth de Ranfaing, who having become a widow in 1617, was later sought in marriage by a physician (afterwards burned under judicial sentence for being a practicing magician).  After being rejected, he gave her philters to make her love him which occasioned strange developments in her health and proceeded to continuously give her some other forms of medicament. The maladies which she suffered were incurable by the various physicians that attended her and eventually led to a recourse of exorcisms as prescribed by several physicians that examined her case.

They began to exorcise her in September, 1619. During the exorcisms, the demon that possessed her made detailed and fluid responses in varying languages including French, Greek, Latin, Hebrew and Italian and was reportedly able to know and recite the thoughts and sins of various individuals who examined her. She was further also able to describe in detail with the use of various languages the rites and secrets of the church to experts in the languages she spoke. There was even a mention of how the demon interrupted an exorcist, who after making a mistake in his recital of an exorcism rite in Latin, corrected his speech and mocked him.

Vampirism
Calmet describes the vampire as a "revenant corpse" thus distinguishing the intangible ghosts such as phantoms or spirits. He conducted a synthesis of studies on the subject and considers that vampirism is the result of undernourished Balkan. As Calmet amassed numerous reports on events of vampires, his attempt to refute false claims of vampirism proved difficult:

[T]hey see, it is said, men who have been dead for several months, come back to earth, talk, walk, infest villages, ill use both men and beasts, suck the blood of their near relations, make them ill, and finally cause their death; so that people can only save themselves from their dangerous visits and their hauntings by exhuming them, impaling them, cutting off their heads, tearing out the heart, or burning them. These revenants are called by the name of oupires or vampires, that is to say, leeches; and such particulars are related of them, so singular, so detailed, and invested with such probable circumstances and such judicial information, that one can hardly refuse to credit the belief which is held in those countries, that these revenants come out of their tombs and produce those effects which are proclaimed of them.

Calmet analyzed many famous cases including that of Arnold Paole. Calmet also investigated the Lettres juives in which an account of a vampire had been recorded in 1732 Hungary, witnessed by officers of the tribunal of Belgrade and an officer to the emperor's troops at Graditz. Although the letters were published as an epistolary novel, it was widely believed to be accurate and true records by the populace at the time.

Also investigated were various judicial cases of dead persons reported to return from the grave and attack and suck the blood of the living. One such case was in 1730 of a soldier lodged at the house of a peasant in Hungary. As the soldier sat with the homeowner and the rest of the company at the table for dinner, a person he did not know came into the home and quietly sat at the table with them. The homeowner appeared frightened and was discovered deceased the next day. After inquiry, the soldier learned that the father of the homeowner had died and was buried 10 years before and the family believed the man who came the previous night was the father's body.

The soldier informed the regiment, giving notice to the general officers who commissioned the captain of the infantry to further investigate. The captain, accompanied by other officers, a surgeon and an auditor had recorded dispositions of the family who confirmed the soldier's report and also received dispositions of all the residents of the village. The corpse of the father was ordered to be exhumed and was found to be in the likeness of a man recently deceased but with the blood-flow of a living man. The Count de Cabreras ordered the corpse's head to be cut off and to be reinterred in his tomb.

The count also received other information of another man dead for more than thirty years that was reported by family to have come back to his house on three separate occasions during meal time. On the first he had sucked the blood from the neck of his brother, the second time from one of his sons, and the third from one of the servants in the house, all three of which had died immediately after. Upon this disposition, the commissary took the suspected corpse from the grave, finding it to be like the first corpse discovered with a living blood-flow and he ordered them to run a large nail through the temple then placed the body back into the grave.

Reactions and scholarly criticism
Calmet's treatise was awarded numerous approbations and letters of criticism following his first publication in 1746, many of which were included in its republication and expanded 1751 version that included new chapters to answer his audience.

The treatise received 'Approbation of the King' to the 7th Register on the registry of The Chamber of Royal Booksellers and Printers to Paris on 9 June 1751.

He is mentioned by Voltaire who in his Dictionnaire philosophique explains:

Calmet became their historian, and treated vampires as he treated the Old and New Testament, reporting faithfully all that had been said before him

Cultural impact 
Calmet analyzed a report that was written from a priest who learned information of a town being tormented by a vampiric entity 3 years earlier. After having traveled to the town to investigate and collect information of the various inhabitants there, the priest learned that a vampire had tormented many of the inhabitants at night by coming out from the nearby cemetery to haunt many of the residents at their beds.

An unknown Hungarian traveler came to the town during this time and helped the town by setting a trap at the cemetery which ultimately led to the decapitation of the vampire that resided there and curing the town of their torment. This story was retold by Sheridan Le Fanu and adapted into the thirteenth chapter of the novella Carmilla, a work that heavily inspired Bram Stoker's classic Dracula.

See also

Notes

References

External links
 Available Online in French Traité sur les apparitions des esprits et sur les vampires ou les revenans de Hongrie, de Moravie, etc. (1746), 2 t. 1751
 Available Online in English. 

1751 books
Books in political philosophy
Demonological literature
Magic (supernatural)
Occult books
Philosophy of science books
Philosophy of religion literature
Theses
Vampirism
Witchcraft treatises
Witch hunter manuals
Demonic possession
Treatises